Zachary Channing Fox (born December 6, 1990) is an American stand-up comedian, rapper, writer, actor, illustrator and internet personality from Atlanta, Georgia. He has collaborated with Kenny Beats, Flying Lotus, and Thundercat.

Career
Fox got his start in 2013 on Twitter, tweeting jokes and amassing tens of thousands of followers under the alias "Bootymath." In subsequent years, he dropped the alias and expanded into music, joining the Awful Records collective. In 2017, his publicity increased as he illustrated the album sleeve of Thundercat's album Drunk, and also acted in and wrote for Kuso, the 2017 horror comedy film directed by Flying Lotus.

In October 2018, Fox released his first song, "Square Up" in collaboration with hip hop producer Kenny Beats.

In April 2019, Fox appeared on The Cave, a YouTube series in which Kenny Beats invites different artists to freestyle in his studio. Kenny and Fox recorded "Jesus Is the One (I Got Depression)," in the episode, and the song reached the number one spot on Spotify's U.S. viral chart on July 8, 2019. The two never intended to release the song commercially, but after its success they released an official version of it in June.

His 2019 single "The Bean Kicked In" is featured on FlyLo FM, a fictional radio station in Grand Theft Auto V hosted by record producer Flying Lotus.

On October 15, 2021, Zack Fox released his debut studio album "shut the fuck up talking to me."

Personal life
Fox has been in a relationship with DJ and wellness influencer Kat Matutina since 2019. The couple resides in Los Angeles.

Filmography

Discography

Studio albums

Extended Plays

Singles

References

21st-century American comedians
21st-century American male actors
21st-century American rappers
American illustrators
American male comedians
American stand-up comedians
Comedians from Georgia (U.S. state)
Living people
Male actors from Atlanta
Rappers from Atlanta
1990 births